Vijayan K Pillai (born  1948) is Professor, School of Social Work and PhD Program Director / Graduate Adviser at the University of Texas at Arlington.

He received his Ph.D. from the University of Iowa in 1983, with a thesis on "Determinants of the first birth interval."    Prior to joining University of Texas at Arlington, Pillai taught at the University of North Texas, University of Iowa, and University of Zambia. He was the Zellerbach Visiting Professor, University of California, Berkeley, Fall 2004. He has Published nearly 100   papers and book chapters,  including 35 peer-reviewed journal articles, and authored/ co authored and edited 13 books/ monographs. His primary interests are in developing countries, human reproduction, gerontology and demography. He is a referee to over thirty international journals.

Publications

Books
Sunil, T. S., and Vijayan K. Pillai. Women's Reproductive Health in Yemen. Amherst, N.Y.: Cambria Press, 2010. 
Review,   Reference & Research Book News May 2010
Littell, Julia H., Jacqueline Corcoran, and Vijayan K. Pillai. Systematic Reviews and Meta-Analysis. Oxford: Oxford University Press, 2008.  Held in 384 libraries according to  
Review, Research on Social Work Practice v. 18 no. 5 (Sept. 2008).
Review, Children & Youth Services Review v. 31 no. 4 (Apr. 2009).
Crow, Thomas, and Vijayan K. Pillai. Designing a Teenage Pregnancy Prevention Program: The Behavioral Performance Theory. Lewiston, N.Y.: Edwin Mellen Press, 2006.  
Review,    SciTech Book News June 2006
Weinstein, Jay A., and Vijayan K. Pillai. Demography: The Science of Population. Boston, Mass: Allyn and Bacon, 2001. 
Achola, Paul Pius Waw, and Vijayan K. Pillai. Challenges of Primary Education in Developing Countries: Insights from Kenya. Aldershot: Ashgate, 2000. 
 Pillai, Vijayan K., Lyle W. Shannon, and Judith L. McKim., eds.  Developing Areas: A Book of Readings and Research. Oxford: Berg, 1995. 
Review   WorldViews: A Quarterly Review of Resources for Education and Action Jan 1996 v12 p6
Pillai, Vijayan K., and Guang-zhen Wang. Women's Reproductive Rights in Developing Countries. Aldershot, Hants, England: Ashgate, 1999. .  In 316 libraries according to worldCat
Review Journal of Economic Literature Dec 1999 v37 i4 p1794
Review,   Reference & Research Book News Nov 1999 v14 p109
Review, CHOICE: Current Reviews for Academic Libraries Oct 1999 v37 i2 p416(1)

Selected journal articles
His most-cited peer-reviewed journal articles are:
Pampel, Pillal, V.K.  "Patterns and determinants of infant-mortality in developed nations, 1950-1975", Demography   volume: 23   issue: 4   pages: 525-542   published: Nov 1986.
times cited: 35 .
 Pei XM, Pillai VK, "Old age support in China: The role of the state and the family" International Journal of Aging and Development  Volume: 49   Issue: 3   Pages: 197-212   Published: 1999
Times Cited: 13 (Web of Science)

References

External links
 Personal website 
 
 Vijayan K. Pillai, UT Arlington professor in the School of Social Work, was recently quoted in The Economic Times, India and on the topic of opportunities and challenges for India and China in an era of global-ization, which appeared in India’s Daily News and Analysis

American sociologists
Living people
University of Iowa alumni
1940s births
Year of birth missing (living people)
University of Kerala alumni